The Saddharmarathnakaraya,  and  is a historical Sinhala Buddhist religious text compendium and was compiled as an explanation to a  anthology by Dhammadinnáchárya Vimalakiththi, who was well known as a talented pupil of Dharmakeerthi Sangharája at the Monastery of Palábaddala while Parakramabahu VI of Kotte was ruling the Kingdom of Kotte in the 15th century.

The name Saddharmarathnakaraya is a compound formed of Sadt (Noble), Dharma (Teachings of the Buddha), Rathna (Gems) and Ákara (Lode). Hence, it simply means that The lode of gems-like noble Dharma.

Affected base of era
The era in which King Parákramabáhu VI (1412–1467)—who was the last native sovereign to unify all of Sri Lanka under one rule—was ruling the Kingdom of Kotte is well known as the golden era of Sinhala poetry. The great poetry collections such as Kavyashekaraya, Panchikapradipikawa of Sri Rahula, Guththila Kavyaya of Weththewe, Budugunalankaraya, Loweda Sangarawa of Vidagama Maithriya, Elushilo shathakaya, and the five Sandesha Kavyayas (messenger poetry) viz. Parevi Sandeshaya, Selalihini Sandeshaya, Gira Sandeshaya, Hansa Sandeshaya, and Kokila sandeshaya were compiled in this era. Saddharmarathnakaraya is the only work created fully in the Kotte era. It is considered the last link in a chain of great literary work, including Amawathura, Buthsarana, Saddharmarathnawaliya, Pujawaliya, and Saddharmalankaraya.

It is believed that this book had been used as a reference for Sri saddharmawawada sangrahaya, Sarartha Sangrahaya of the Mahanuwara era.

Structure
It consists of eight (08) Sangraha Kathá,  - compendiums of controversy and twenty eight (28) more points of controversy as follow.
 Prakeernaka Sangraha Katha  - Controversy of auxiliary compendiums.
 Abhinihara Sangraha Katha  - Controversy of non-exterminated compendiums.
 Dashaparamartha Paramitha Sangraha Katha  - Controversy of deci-ultimate realistic perfections of compendiums.
 Abhinishkramana Sangraha Katha  - Controversy of renunciation compendiums.
 Maithriya Sangraha Katha  - Controversy of loving-kindness compendiums.
 Buddhadbhutha Kriya Sangraha Katha  - Controversy of compendiums about miraculous performance and super-humanity of Buddha.
 Milindu Raja Katha  - Controversy of King Milinda.
 Sthavira Katha  - Controversy of Bhikkus
 Panchananthardhana Katha  - Controversy of the disappearances of the five Dharmas.
 Chakravarti Vibhawana Katha  - Controversy of appearing of King Chakravarti and his treasures in eight.
 Dharmadbhutha Katha  - Controversy of miraculous superiority of Dharma.
 Chaithya Katha  - Controversy of tumulus or shrines done for eight reasons.
 Sammajjhananishansa Katha  - Controversy of good consequences received by Bhikkhus in six occasions.
 Mathika mathu Katha  - Controversy of mother of Mathu.
 Swapna Dipana Katha  - Controversy of revelations of dreams.
 Karma Vibhaga Katha  - Controversy of divisions of Karma.
 Sarana Sila Prabheda Katha  - Controversy of categories of precepts.
 Danadi Kushala sangraha Katha  - Controversy of compendiums about alms and so-called karmically wholesome acts.

Reasons for compiling the book
As mentioned above, Dammadinnacharya Wimalakiththi was a faithful pupil of Dharmakeerthi Sangharaja who was the author of a range of excellent scripture namely Saddharmalankaraya, Jina Bodhawaliya, Shasanawatharaya, Balawatharaya,  and Sankshepa Sannaya of Gampola era. Having a mastering knowledge of Nidhanasthana,  (Treasuries of consistence), Prabhawasthana,  (Origins of consistence) and Upanishrayasthana,  (Applicable facts of consistence) of Dhamma, the author has anxious to compile the book with the will, to achieve his ambition to exceed the Samsara at present of Maithri Sammasambuddha, housed in his deep mind.

He reveals it at the end of Prakeernaka Sangraha Katha saying,
" Accepting respectfully the order of our lord in his supremacy and ultimate kindness, Bhasaye jothaye Dhammang,  the bright Dhamma and even if it is absolutely hard to find such rare higherst excellencies (Buddhas), super-masteres in preaching Dhamma in a manner of so called diversity and a noble accent, I am, as a disciple of lord Buddha, hereby so pleased to expound the blessed Dhamma in 'Hela Basa' (the ancient figure of Sinhala) to those who are unable to do due to their incapacity and lack of wealth but filled with Shraddha enough to respond and do favour for the household..."

The other reason, according to Dhammadinnacharya Vimalakiththi, the author of the book, Saddharmarathnakaraya was a request of Wickramabahu Maha Sthavira and the Upasaka Weerasundara Kumara (a disciple of the author).

See also

Kingdom of Kotte
Thotagamuwe Sri Rahula Thera
History of Sri Lanka
Guththila Kawya

References

Sri Lankan Buddhist texts
Transitional period of Sri Lanka